Synaptotagmin-like protein 1 is a protein that in humans is encoded by the SYTL1 gene.

Model organisms 

Model organisms have been used in the study of SYTL1 function. A conditional knockout mouse line, called Sytl1tm1a(KOMP)Wtsi was generated as part of the International Knockout Mouse Consortium program — a high-throughput mutagenesis project to generate and distribute animal models of disease to interested scientists.

Male and female animals underwent a standardized phenotypic screen to determine the effects of deletion. Twenty four tests were carried out on homozygous mutant mice and six significant abnormalities were observed. Females had abnormal locomotor coordination, caudal vertebral transformation, decreased circulating amylase levels and increased mean platelet volume. Both sexes displayed decreased IgG2b levels and abnormal peripheral blood lymphocyte parameters.

Interactions 

SYTL1 has been shown to interact with RAB27A.

References

Further reading 

 
 
 
 
 
 
 

Genes mutated in mice